Demineralisation or demineralization may refer to:

 Demineralization (physiology)
 Bone demineralisation leading to osteoporosis; see Bone mineralization
 Tooth demineralisation that leads to dental caries; see Remineralisation of teeth
 Demineralizing (silk worm cocoon)

See also
 Deionization
 Desalination
 Mineralization (disambiguation)
 Remineralization (disambiguation)